The little slaty flycatcher (Ficedula basilanica) is a species of bird in the family Muscicapidae.
It is found on the islands of Mindanao, Leyte and Samar in the Philippines.

Its natural habitat is tropical moist lowland forests.
It is threatened by habitat loss.

Description 
EBird describes the bird as "A small bird of tangled undergrowth in lowland and foothill forest. White below with pale orange legs. Male has dark gray upperparts and a short white stripe behind each eye. Upperparts are dark brown in female with no head stripes. Female similar to Chestnut-tailed Jungle Flycatcher, but has orange legs and a dark brown rather than chestnut tail. Song consists of short, varied whistled notes, often in a rising or falling series. Also gives single thin high downslurred whistles."

They are sexually dimorphic in which males have the eponymous slaty-grey color with the females being light brown.

Habitat and Conservation Status 
Its natural habitats at tropical moist lowland primary forest and well developed secondary forest up to 1,200 meters above sea level. It is often seen close to the forest floor staying in the low understory.

IUCN has assessed this bird as vulnerable with the population being estimated at 2,500 to 9,999 mature individuals. Extensive lowland deforestation on all islands in its range is the main threat. Most remaining lowland forest that is not afforded protection leaving it vulnerable to both legal and Illegal logging, conversion into farmlands through Slash-and-burn and mining.

It occurs in the protected areas of Pasonanca Natural Park, Mount Apo National Park and Mt. Hilong-hilon National Park but enforcement and protection from loggers are lax.

References

External links
 Image at ADW

little slaty flycatcher
Birds of Mindanao
Fauna of Samar
Endemic birds of the Philippines
little slaty flycatcher
Taxonomy articles created by Polbot